Foamy virus may refer to:

 Equine foamy virus
 Human foamy virus
 Simian foamy virus
 Spumavirus